Mahmoud Farshidi is an Iranian politician and the Minister of Education of Iran from 2005 to 2008. He was nominated for the post on the 2 November 2005 by president Mahmoud Ahmadinejad.  There was some controversy over the appointment due to his lack of experience.  He was approved by the Iranian legislative on the 9 November by 136 votes to 91.

He is a former writer for the conservative Resalat newspaper.

References

External links
Article by Mahmoud Farshidi in Resalat newspaper in 2003

Living people
Government ministers of Iran
Popular Front of Islamic Revolution Forces politicians
Impeached Iranian officials
Society of Devotees of the Islamic Revolution politicians
Year of birth missing (living people)